SM UB-49 was a German Type UB III submarine or U-boat in the German Imperial Navy during World War I. She was commissioned into the German Imperial Navy on 28 June 1917 as SM UB-49.

UB-49 served mainly in the Mediterranean. In the Austro-Hungarian Navy she was listed as SM U-80. In eight wartime patrols she sank 40 ships totaling  and one escort. After the Armistice with Germany UB-49 returned to Kiel via Norway. Handed over to the United Kingdom on 16 January 1919, she was broken up in Swansea in 1922.

Construction

UB-49 was ordered by the German Imperial Navy on 20 May 1916. She was built by Blohm & Voss, Hamburg and following just under a year of construction, launched at Hamburg on 6 January 1917. UB-49 was commissioned later that same year under the command of Kapitänleutnant (Kptlt.) Hans von Mellenthin. Like all Type UB III submarines, UB-49 carried 10 torpedoes and was armed with an  deck gun. UB-49 had a displacement of  while surfaced and  when submerged. Her engines enabled her to travel at  when surfaced and  when submerged.

Service history

First War Patrol
On 22 August 1917, UB-49 left Kiel for Cattaro to join the Pola Flotilla passing the Orkney-Shetland barrier four days later. Before breaking through the Strait of Gibraltar, UB-49 sank six ships, damaging one further. On 9 September 1917 loss of fuel forced UB-49 to change course and make for Cadiz in neutral Spain.

Second War Patrol
While Spanish authorities planned to intern UB-49 for the duration of the war, her crew managed to repair the damage to the fuel tanks and bunker enough oil to reach Cattaro. On 6 October 1917, UB-49 slipped out of the harbour and reached Cattaro nine days later with no fuel left. After refuelling UB-49 sailed for Pola where the boat was repaired.

Third War Patrol
On 11 December 1917, UB-49 left Pola for a cruise in the Gulf of Genoa. Already on the first day, UB-49 was attacked by an enemy submarine. The next day, two Italian sailing ships were sunk, while exchanging fire with a coastal battery at the same time. On 15 December 1917, UB-49 managed to sink three steamers out of a convoy leaving Genoa, followed by two more the next day. On 22 December 1917, another two steamers were hit by torpedoes of UB-49. The last torpedo on this cruise UB-49 used on a British steamer off Naples.

Fourth War Patrol
Between 23 January and 13 February 1918 UB-49 operated in the Gulf of Genoa again, sinking several Italian sailing ships, a British steamer and an Italian escort vessel, G 32. Using compressed air to blow out all ballast tanks simultaneously, UB-49 was able to surface again and continue her journey to Cattaro.

Fifth War Patrol
On 5 March 1918, UB-49 left Cattaro again to operate in the Tyrrhenian Sea. From 13 March 1918 UB-49 pursued a convoy leaving Genoa for Naples and in two days managed to sink three out of four steamers. East of Sardinia, an Italian steamer and a French tug boat fell victim to UB-49. Between 19 and 21 March 1918, UB-49 operated in the Gulf of Naples, sinking several Italian sailing ships and shelling the fortifications of Civitavecchia. A fire in one of the dynamos forced UB-49 to return to base on 25 March 1918.

Sixth War Patrol
UB-49 sailed on 11 May 1918 for her sixth war patrol, which led her into the Gulf of Lion and the Western Mediterranean. In the last week of May, UB-49 successfully attacked Allied shipping south of the Balearic Islands, sinking three steamers. On 2 June, UB-49 - running low on fuel - turned back to Pola for a major overhaul. When she arrived there on 12 June 1918, Kptlt. von Mellenthin handed over command of UB-49 to Oberleutnant zur See (Oblt.z.S.) Alfred Ehrensberger.

Seventh War Patrol
After three months in port, UB-49 went to sea again on 11 September 1918. Headed for the Western Mediterranean, Ehrensberger was less successful  than von Mellenthin. A strong Allied presence of escorts pressed UB-49 under the surface more and more often. Nevertheless, UB-49 sank two ships off the Spanish coast. UB-49 made port again on 12 October 1918.

Eighth War Patrol
When it became apparent that Austria-Hungary's situation was untenable, UB-49 was ordered to return to Kiel. Leaving Pola on 29 October 1918 she reached the Norwegian port of Lervik in the last week of November 1918. Together with most of the other U-boats from the Mediterranean, UB-49 arrived in Kiel on 29 November 1918.

Aftermath
The Armistice with Germany required that all U-boats had to be surrendered to the Allies. UB-49 was handed over to the United Kingdom on 16 January 1919. In 1922 the U-boat was broken up in Swansea.

Summary of raiding history

Notes

References

Bibliography 

 

1917 ships
Ships built in Hamburg
German Type UB III submarines
U-boats commissioned in 1917
World War I submarines of Germany